Microsoft Build (often stylised as ) is an annual conference event held by Microsoft, aimed at software engineers and web developers using Windows, Microsoft Azure and other Microsoft technologies. First held in 2011, it serves as a successor for Microsoft's previous developer events, the Professional Developers Conference (an infrequent event which covered development of software for the Windows operating system) and MIX (which covered web development centering on Microsoft technology such as Silverlight and ASP.net). The attendee price was (US)$2,195 in 2016, up from $2,095 in 2015. It sold out quickly, within one minute of the registration site opening in 2016.

Format
The event has been held at a large convention center, or purpose-built meeting space on the Microsoft Campus. The Keynote on the first day has been led by the Microsoft CEO addressing the press and developers. It has been the place to announce the general technology milestones for developers. There are breakout sessions conducted by engineers and program managers, most often Microsoft employees representing their particular initiatives. The keynote on the second day often includes deeper dives into technology. Thousands of developers and technologists from all over the world attend.

Events

2011
Build 2011 was held from September 13 to September 16, 2011 in Anaheim, California. The conference heavily focused on Windows 8, Windows Server 2012 and Visual Studio 2012; their Developer Preview versions were also released during the conference. Attendees also received a Samsung tablet shipping with the Windows 8 "Developer Preview" build.

2012
Held on Microsoft's campus in Redmond from October 30 to November 2, 2012, the 2012 edition of Build focused on the recently released Windows 8, along with Windows Azure and Windows Phone 8. Attendees received a Surface RT tablet with Touch Cover, a Nokia Lumia 920 smartphone, and 100GB of free SkyDrive storage.

2013
Build 2013 was held from June 26 to June 28, 2013 at the Moscone Center (North and South) in San Francisco. The conference was primarily used to unveil the Windows 8.1 update for Windows 8. Each attendee received a Surface Pro, Acer Iconia W3 (the first 8-inch Windows 8 tablet) with a Bluetooth keyboard, one year of Adobe Creative Cloud and 100GB of free SkyDrive storage.

2014
Build 2014 was held at the Moscone Center (West) in San Francisco from April 2 to April 4, 2014. Build attendees received a free Xbox One and a $500 Microsoft Store gift card.

Highlights:
 Windows Display Driver Model 2.0 and DirectX 12
 Microsoft Cortana
 Windows Phone 8.1
 Windows 8.1 Spring Update
 Windows free on all devices with a screen size of 9" or less and on IoT
 Bing Knowledge widget and app linking
 .NET Native (Announcement, Product Page)
 .NET Compiler Platform (Roslyn)
 Visual Studio 2013 Update 2 RC
 Team Foundation Server 2013 Update 2 RTM
 TypeScript 1.0
 .NET Foundation

2015
Build 2015 was held at the Moscone Center (West) in San Francisco from April 29 to May 1, 2015. Registration fee is $2095, and opened at 9:00am PST on Thursday, January 22 and "sold out" in under an hour with an unspecified number of attendees. Build attendees received a free HP Spectre x360 ultrabook.

Highlights:
 Windows 10
 Windows 10 Mobile
 HoloLens and Windows Holographic
 Windows Server 2016
 Microsoft Exchange Server 2016
 Visual Studio 2015
 Visual Studio Code

2016
Build 2016 was held at the Moscone Center in San Francisco from March 30 to April 1, 2016. The price was $2195, an increase of $100 compared to the previous year. The conference was sold out in 1 minute. Unlike previous years, there were no hardware gifts for attendees.

Highlights:
 Windows Subsystem for Linux
 Cortana chatbot on Skype
 "Power of the Pen and the PC"
 .NET Standard Library
 ASP.NET Core
 Browser extension support for Edge
 Windows 10 Anniversary Update
 Xamarin
 Free for individuals, open source projects, academic research, education, and small professional teams.
 Remoted iOS Simulator for Windows

2017
The 2017 Build conference took place at the Washington State Convention Center in Downtown Seattle, Washington from May 10 to May 12, 2017. It had been at Moscone Center for the previous four years. However, Moscone center was undergoing renovations from April through August 2017. The Seattle location brought the conference close to the Microsoft headquarters in Redmond, Washington. The price remained at $2195 for the 2017 conference. There were no devices given away at this conference to attendees.

Highlights:
 Azure Cosmos DB
 Visual Studio for Mac
 WSL: Fedora and SUSE support
 Xamarin Live Player
 Windows 10 Fall Creators Update
 Microsoft Fluent Design System

2018
The 2018 Build conference took place at the Washington State Convention Center in Downtown Seattle, Washington May 7 to May 9, 2018. The price has increased $300 to $2495 for the 2018 conference. The conference was preceded by the Windows Developer Awards 2018 ceremony.

Highlights:
 .NET
 .NET Core 3
 ML.NET
 Azure
 Azure CDN
 Azure Confidential Computing
 Azure Database Migration Service
 Azure Maps
 Microsoft 365
 Microsoft Store: increased developer revenue share (95%; Non-Game App via deeplink only)
 Visual Studio
 App Center
 IntelliCode
 Live Share
 Windows 10 Redstone 5
 Cloud Clipboard
 Microsoft Notepad: Unix/Linux EOL support
 Xamarin
 Hyper-V Android Emulator
 Automatic iOS Device Provisioning
 Xamarin.Essentials
 Xamarin.Forms 3.0

2019
The 2019 Build conference took place at the Washington State Convention Center in Downtown Seattle, Washington from May 6 to May 8, 2019 plus optional post-event learning activities on next two days. The price decreased $100 to $2395 for the 2019 conference. Registration started on February 27.

Highlights:

 .NET 5: next multi-platform .NET Core
 Azure: Azure SQL Database Edge
 Fluid Framework
 Visual Studio: IntelliCode
 Visual Studio Code: Remote Development Extension Pack
 Visual Studio Online
 Windows Subsystem for Linux 2
 Windows Terminal: cmd.exe, PowerShell, and WSL in tabs

2020
Microsoft announced the dates for Build, and their other large conferences on September 16, 2019, with pricing set at $2395. The physical 2020 Build conference, scheduled to take place in downtown Seattle, Washington from May 19 to May 21, 2020, was initially cancelled due the coronavirus pandemic. On April 20, 2020, Microsoft opened sign-ups for a replacement, virtual event, held the same date as the originally intended physical event; the virtual event was free of charge.

Highlights:
 .NET Multi-platform App UI (.NET MAUI)
 Windows Subsystem for Linux (WSL)
 GPU support (for CUDA and DirectML)
 Windows Package Manager

2021
The 2021 conference, once again a free-of-charge virtual event, was held on May 25 to 27, 2021.

Highlights:

 .NET 6
 Azure
 Azure AI Services
 Azure Bot Service
 Azure Metrics Advisor
 Azure Video Analyzer
 Azure Cognitive Services
 Power Fx
 PyTorch Enterprise on Microsoft Azure
 Microsoft Build of OpenJDK
 Windows Subsystem for Linux GUI (WSLg)

2022
The 2022 conference, once again a free-of-charge virtual event, was held on May 24 to 26, 2022.

2023
The 2023 conference was announced on March 14, 2023. It will have a free online part from May 23 to 24 and an in-person part in Seattle from May 23 to 25 with workshops on May 22. Tickets for the in-person event are $1525 and workshops are $225.

Attendee Party Venues
2011: The Grove
2012: Seattle Armory
2013: Pier 48
2014: AMC Metreon
2015: AMC Metreon
2016: Block Party Yerba Ln
2017: CenturyLink Field
2018: Museum of Pop Culture / Chihuly Garden and Glass
2019: CenturyLink Field
2020: Online
2021: Online
2022: Online
2023: Unannounced Seattle venue

See also
Microsoft
Worldwide Developers Conference
Google I/O
Hackathon
Samsung Developer Conference (SDC)

References

External links

 
 Build Event on MSDN Channel 9 
 Build Sessions on Microsoft.com
 Events on Microsoft Docs
 DevBlogs on Microsoft.com

Microsoft conferences